Trees Dream in Algebra is the first studio album from Irish alternative-rock group Codes.

Track listing

Peak positions

External links
Codes' official site

2009 debut albums
Codes (band) albums